The Master of the Order of Preachers is the Superior General of the Order of Preachers, commonly known as the Dominicans.

The Master of the Order of Preachers is ex officio Grand Chancellor of the Pontifical University of Saint Thomas Aquinas, Angelicum in Rome, Italy, and of the Pontifical and Royal University of Santo Tomas in Manila, Philippines.

Fr. Gerard Francisco Timoner III is the Master of the Order, as of his 2019 election at the General Chapter held in Biên Hòa.

Masters of the Order

Notes

References 

Dominican Order
Dominicans